Aage Krarup Nielsen (30 July 1891 – 29 January 1972) was a travel writer.

In the days before the Second World War, Nielsen traveled the world. His travel accounts, primarily published by Gyldendalske Boghandel, Copenhagen, in Denmark, were quite popular and issued in a variety of editions and bindings.

Books
1921 - En hvalfangerfærd (Antarctic Exploration, Falkland Islands, etc.)
1923 - En østerlandfærd
1924 - Fra Mandalay til Moskva (From Mandalay to Moscow)
1925 - Mads Lange til Bali
1927 - Dragen vaagner
1928 - Mellem kannibaler og paradisfugle (Between Cannibals and Birds of Paradise)
1929 - I doktorbaad og Karriol (Lapland)
1931 - Perler og palmer
1932 - Fra Moskva til Persepolis (From Moscow to Persepolis [Persepolis is an ancient city in Iran (Persia)])
1933 - Helvedet hinsides havet (Hell Across the Sea, French Guiana)
1934 - Blandt hovedjægere i Ecuador
1935 - Marco Polos rejser (Marco Polo's Travels)
1936 - Hell Beyond the Seas (Vanguard Press)
1937 - Sol over Mexico (Sun Over Mexico)
1939 - Aloha (Hawaii, Fiji, Tahiti, etc.)
1940 - Hans Falk fra Maketu
1942 - Landet med lykkelige smil (Land of the Fortunate Smile)
1944 - Paa krydstogt mod Ny Guinea
1946 - Fra en helt anden verden
1947 - Gensyn med Østen (Return to the East)
1949 - Kimono og khaki (Kimono and Khaki - Occupied Japan)
1951 - Fra Korea til Bali (From Korea to Bali)
1954 - Merdeka
1956 - Sorte sorgløse Haïti
1958 - De gyldne pagoders land (Land of Golden Pagodas - Burma)

Danish male writers
1891 births
1972 deaths